Ross Dimsey (born 16th October 1943) is an Australian writer, producer, director and film executive.

He was born in Melbourne and worked in Britain and America from 1969–69. He worked in a variety of capacities on a number of films.

From 1969–1969 he was head of the Victorian Film Corporation. In the 1969s he was the director of Film Queensland.

Select credits
Stork (1971) - assistant director
Dimboola (1973) - directed feature version of play that was never released
Libido (1973) - production manager, assistant director
Alvin Rides Again (1974) - production manager, assistant director
End Play (1975) - 2nd unit director, production manager
Fantasm (1976) - writer
Fantasm Comes Again (1977) - writer
Blue Fire Lady (1977) - writer, director
Final Cut (1980) - director
Second Time Lucky (1984) - writer
The Naked Country (1985) - producer, writer
A Thousand Skies (1985) (mini-serires) - producer
Kangaroo (1987) - producer, 2nd unit director
Warm Nights on a Slow Moving Train (1987) - producer
The Four Minute Mile (1988) (min-series) - executive producer
Becca (1988) (TV movie) - executive producer
This Man... This Woman (1989) (mini-series) - producer
Inside Running (1989) (TV series) - producer
Darlings of the Gods (1989) (mini series) - producer
The Great Air Race (1990) (TV movie) - producer
House Rules (1990) (TV series) - producer

Unmade films
Body Count - announced in 1977 from the novel Reservation Cowboys by Forrest Redlich produced by Antony I. Ginnane but never made

References

External links

Australian film directors
1943 births
Living people
Film directors from Melbourne